Rugby sevens at the World Games 2001 was played at Akita Yabase Stadium in Akita, Japan on 25–26 August 2001. Fiji won the final against Australia by the score of 35 to 19.

Teams
8 Teams took part in this tournament

Pool phase

Pool A 
{| class="wikitable" style="text-align: center;"
|-
! style="width:200px;" | Team
! width="40" | Pld
! width="40" | W
! width="40" | D
! width="40" | L
! width="40" | PF
! width="40" | PA
! width="40" | +/-
! width="40" | Pts
|- bgcolor=#d0ffd0
| align=left |  || 3 || 3 || 0 || 0 || 108 || 19  ||  || 9
|- bgcolor=#d0ffd0
| align=left |  || 3 || 2 || 0 || 1 || 69  || 50  ||  || 7
|- bgcolor=#d0ffd0
| align=left |  || 3 || 1 || 0 || 2 || 40  || 49  ||  || 5 
|- bgcolor=#d0ffd0
| align=left |  || 3 || 0 || 0 || 3 || 12  || 111 ||  || 3 
|}

Pool B 
{| class="wikitable" style="text-align: center;"
|-
! style="width:200px;" | Team
! width="40" | Pld
! width="40" | W
! width="40" | D
! width="40" | L
! width="40" | PF
! width="40" | PA
! width="40" | +/-
! width="40" | Pts
|- bgcolor=#d0ffd0
| align=left |  || 3 || 3 || 0 || 0 || 85 || 19  ||  || 9
|- bgcolor=#d0ffd0
| align=left |  || 3 || 2 || 0 || 1 || 95 || 33  ||  || 7
|- bgcolor=#d0ffd0
| align=left |  || 3 || 1 || 0 || 2 || 45 || 73  ||  || 5
|- bgcolor=#d0ffd0
| align=left |  || 3 || 0 || 0 || 3 || 12 || 112 ||  || 3
|}

Knock-out phase

Finals

Classification matches

References

2001 World Games
2001
World Games
World